Robin des bois, la véritable histoire  is a 2015 French comedy film.

Plot
Robin Hood is a seedy crook. He and his accomplice Tuck rob the poor, women, the elderly, the blind, and the disabled. The rest? Too risky. But even the bad guys have dreams and theirs is to buy the most popular brothel in the city, the Pussycat. Robin, who stops at nothing when it comes to getting rich, then decides to get the money to realize this dream by robbing the Nottingham tax office. But his meeting with a Sherwood gang of vigilantes, who rob the rich to give to the poor, will thwart his plans. Little John, Marianne and their friends have in fact had exactly the same idea as him to rob the Sheriff of Nottingham. The – true – story of Robin Hood can finally begin!

Cast

Reception
In France, the film received generally negative reviews. It achieves a score of 1.9 / 5 on AlloCiné.

References

External links

French parody films
2015 films
French historical comedy films
Robin Hood films
Robin Hood parodies
Films set in the Middle Ages
Films shot in Hungary
2010s parody films
2010s historical comedy films
2015 comedy films
2010s French films
2010s French-language films